Florin Șerban (born 21 January 1975 in Reșița) is a Romanian film director whose film If I Want to Whistle, I Whistle won the Jury Grand Prix and the Alfred Bauer Prize at the 2010 Berlin Film festival. The film was also selected as the Romanian entry for the Best Foreign Language Film at the 83rd Academy Awards but it did not make the final shortlist.

His second movie, Box (2015) premiered at the Karlovy Vary Film Festival and won the FIPRESCI Award. It was also presented at the Toronto International Film Festival in 2015 and at other 10 national and international festivals. 

His third film - Love 1. Dog (2018) opens The Trilogy of Love, three films about three ways of loving. It won the Cineuropa Prize and Art Cinema Prize at 2018 Sarajevo International Film Festival.

His fourth movie is Love 2. America (2020), the second part of The Trilogy of Love.

Filmography
Mecano - coproducer 2001 (short film)
Jumătate de oraş face dragoste cu cealaltă jumătate - short film - 2002
Eu cand vreau sa fluier, fluier - 2010
Box - (2015)
The man who didn't say a thing - 2016
Love 1. Dog - 2018
Love 2. America - 2020

Awards and nominations
Berlin International Film Festival - 2010 - Silver Bear
Berlin International Film Festival - 2010 - Alfred Bauer Award
Festival International du Film Européen Cinedays - 2010 - Best producer
Cleveland International Festival - Central and Eastern European Competition - 2010 - Best Eastern European Movie
Santa Barbara International Film Festival - Eastern Bloc Competition - 2010 - Best Eastern European Movie 
Annonay International Film Festival - 2010 - Best debut
Zlin International Film Festival - 2010 - Best debut
Beaune International Thriller Festival  - 2010 - New Blood Award
Transilvania International Film Festival - 2010 - Best Romanian Movie
Gopo Awards - 2011 - Best producer
 Gopo Awards - 2011 - Best debut
Karlovy Vary International Film Festival - 2015 - Fipresci Award
Sarajevo International Film Festival - 2018 - Cineuropa Award
 Sarajevo International Film Festival - 2018 - Art Cinema Award

See also
Cinema of Romania
Romanian New Wave

References

External links

Florin Șerban on Cinemagia
Florin Șerban on All About Romanian Cinema

Romanian film directors
People from Reșița
1975 births
Living people